Minuscule 330 (in the Gregory-Aland numbering), δ 259 (Soden), is a Greek minuscule manuscript of the New Testament, on parchment. Palaeographically it has been assigned to the 12th century. It has marginalia. The Greek text of the codex is a representative of the Byzantine text-type.

Description 

The codex contains the text of the New Testament (except Book of Revelation) on 287 parchment leaves with lacunae. The text is written in one column per page, the biblical text in 30 lines per page. There are three ornamental initials and four ornamental head-pieces (leaves 11, 51, 77, 117). It contains 10 pictures, four of them are given on full page, they are portraits of the Evangelists (folios 10v, 76v, 116v, 116v); portrait of John the Evangelist with the pupil St Prokhor. The head-piece to the Gospel of John contains the incorporated medallion bearing a half-length image of Jesus Christ. The initial letter epsilon at the beginning of John contains a figure of John the Evangelist.

There is no sign of interrogative, the nomina sacra are written in an abbreviated forms, the errors of itacism are frequent (e.g. παραδειγματησαι).

There is also a division according to the smaller Ammonian Sections, with references to the Eusebian Canons (written below Ammonian Section numbers).

The order of books is usual for the Greek manuscripts: Gospels, Acts of the Apostles, Catholic epistles, and Pauline epistles.

Text 

The Greek text of the codex is a representative of the Byzantine text-type (except Pauline epistles). Hermann von Soden classified it to the textual family Kx. Aland placed it in Category V (except Paul). The text of the Pauline epistles Aland placed in Category III.
According to the Claremont Profile Method it represents textual group 16 in Luke 1, Luke 10, and Luke 20.

The text of the Gospels textually is close to the manuscripts 16, 119, 217, 491, 578, 693, 1528, and 1588. The text of the Pauline epistles is very close textually to the codices 451, 2400, 2492.

 Textual variants
 Acts 18:26 it reads την του θεου οδον along with P, Ψ, 049, 0142, 104, 451, 1241, 1877, 2127, 2492, Byz, Lect;
 Romans 8:1 it reads Ιησου κατα σαρκα περιπατουσιν αλλα κατα πνευμα (for Ιησου). The reading is supported by אc, Dc, K, P, 33, 88, 104, 181, 326, (436 omit μη), 456, 614, 630, 1241, 1877, 1962, 1984, 1985, 2492, 2495, Byz, Lect.
 Romans 15:19 it supports πνευματος θεου αγιου along with Minuscule 451; other manuscripts read πνευματος θεου or πνευματος αγιου;
 Romans 16:25-27 is following 14:23, as in Codex Angelicus Codex Athous Lavrensis, 0209, Minuscule 181 326 451 460 614 1241 1877 1881 1984 1985 2492 2495.
 1 Corinthians 2:1 it reads μαρτυριον along with B D G P Ψ 33 81 104 181 326 451 614 629 630 1241 1739 1877 1881 1962 1984 2127 2492 2495 Byz Lect it vg syrh copsa arm eth. Other manuscripts read μυστηριον or σωτηριον.
 1 Corinthians 2:14 it reads πνευματος (omit του θεου) along with 2, 216, 255, 440, 451, 823, 1827, and syrp.
 1 Corinthians 7:5 it has unique reading τη προσευχη και νηστεια (prayer and fasting) supported only by 451 and John of Damascus. Other manuscripts have τη νηστεια και τη προσευχη (fasting and prayer) or τη προσευχη (prayer).
 2 Corinthians 9:4 it reads τη υποστασει ταυτη της καυχησεως ημων (Byzantine mss without ημων, Alexandrian and Western mss without της καυχησεως ημων)
 Colossians 4:8 it reads γνω τα περι ημων along with minuscule 451, ℓ 598, and ℓ 1356
 1 Timothy 3:16 it has textual variant  (God manifested) (Sinaiticuse, A2, C2, Dc, K, L, P, Ψ, 81, 104, 181, 326, 330, 436, 451, 614, 629, 630, 1241, 1739, 1877, 1881, 1962, 1984, 1985, 2492, 2495, Byz, Lect), against ὃς ἐφανερώθη (he was manifested) supported by Sinaiticus, Codex Alexandrinus, Ephraemi, Boernerianus, 33, 365, 442, 2127, ℓ 599.
 2 Timothy 4:22 phrase η χαρις μεθ υμων. αμην (supported by all other Greek manuscripts, with variants) is omitted, along with copsamss Ambrosiaster? Pelagius? Ps-Jerome;

History 

Scrivener dated the manuscript to the 11th century. Eduard de Muralt and C. R. Gregory dated the manuscript to the 12th century. Currently it is dated by the INTF to the 12th century.

Until the 1540s the manuscript was kept at the Great Lavra of St Athanasius on Mount Athos, then it belonged to Pierre Seguier (1588-1672), Chancellor of France. It was a part of the Fonds Coislin (Gr. 196). 
At the end of the 18th century Peter P. Dubrovsky (1754-1816), serving as the secretary to the Russian Embassy at Paris, acquired the manuscript. It was added to the list of New Testament manuscripts by Scholz (1794-1852),

The manuscript was described by Bernard de Montfaucon. It was examined and described by Paulin Martin, collated by Eduard de Muralt. A new collation was made by M. Davies.

The restoration work of the manuscript was made in 1968, the portraits of the four Evangelists were repainted.

Since 1805 the manuscript is currently housed at the National Library of Russia (Gr. 101) at Saint Petersburg.

See also 

 List of New Testament minuscules
 Biblical manuscript
 Textual criticism

References

Further reading 

 Bernard de Montfaucon, Bibliotheca  Coisliniana (Paris, 1715), p. 249.
 Eduard de Muralt, Novum Testamentum Graecum (1848).
 Eduard de Muralt, Catalogue des manuscrits grecs de la Bibliothèque Impériale publique (Petersburg 1864), pp. 56–57.
 Ernest Cadman Colwell, The Four Gospels of Karahissar I, History and Text, Chicago, 1936, pp. 170–222.
 Kurt Treu, Die Griechischen Handschriften des Neuen Testaments in der UdSSR; eine systematische Auswertung des Texthandschriften in Leningrad, Moskau, Kiev, Odessa, Tbilisi und Erevan, T & U 90 (Berlin, 1966), pp. 63–67.
 M. Davies, The Text of the Pauline Epistles in MS. 2344 (Studies & Documents 38, 1968)

External links 

 Minuscule 330 at the Encyclopedia of Textual Criticism
 Minuscule 330 at the National Library of Russia

Greek New Testament minuscules
12th-century biblical manuscripts
National Library of Russia collection